Tetrix transsylvanica, the Transsylvanian wingless groundhopper, is a species of insect in the family Tetrigidae. It is found in Romania and Slovenia and may be extinct in Croatia.

References

transsylvanica
Insects described in 1960
Orthoptera of Europe
Taxonomy articles created by Polbot